The Blessing Homestead is a historic farmstead in rural northeastern Faulkner County, Arkansas.  It is located overlooking the west bank of East Fork Cadron Creek, on Happy Valley Road east of County Road 225E, between McGintytown and Centerville. The central feature of the homestead is a dogtrot house, with one pen built of logs and the other of wood framing.  The log pen was built about 1872, and typifies the evolutionary growth of these kinds of structures.  It is the only remaining structure associated with the early history of Barney, most of which was wiped out by a tornado in 1915.

The property was listed on the National Register of Historic Places in 1990.

See also
National Register of Historic Places listings in Faulkner County, Arkansas

References

Houses on the National Register of Historic Places in Arkansas
Houses completed in 1900
Houses in Faulkner County, Arkansas
National Register of Historic Places in Faulkner County, Arkansas